Spaniblennius is a genus of combtooth blennies native to the eastern Atlantic Ocean.

Species
The currently recognized species in this genus are:
 Spaniblennius clandestinus Bath & Wirtz, 1989
 Spaniblennius riodourensis (Metzelaar, 1919)

References

 
Taxa named by Hans Bath
Taxa named by Peter Wirtz
Blenniinae